Who's Your Lady Friend? is a 1937 British comedy film directed by Carol Reed and starring Frances Day, Vic Oliver and Betty Stockfeld. The secretary of a beauty specialist accidentally brings the wrong person back from the railway station, triggering a series of confusions. It was based on a comedy play by Bela Jenbach and Rudolf Österreicher, which had previously been made into an Austrian film The Gentleman Without a Residence three years earlier. It was an independent production made at Ealing Studios. The film's sets were designed by the art director Erwin Scharf.

Cast
 Frances Day as Lulu
 Vic Oliver as Doctor Mangold
 Betty Stockfeld as Mrs. Mangold
 Romney Brent as Fred
 Margaret Lockwood as Mimi
 Sarah Churchill as Maid
 Marcelle Rogez as Yvonne Fatigay
 Muriel George as Mrs. Somers
 Frederick Ranalow as Cabby

Production
It was an early role for Margaret Lockwood and the second of several collaborations with Carol Reed.

Critical reception
TV Guide called the film a "Cute farce and one of the many British programmers Reed directed before moving up to bigger features."

References

Bibliography
Wood, Linda. British Films, 1927–1939. British Film Institute, 1986.

External links

Who's Your Lady Friend at Britmovie
Who's Your Lady Friend? at TCMDB

1937 films
1937 comedy films
Films directed by Carol Reed
Ealing Studios films
British comedy films
Remakes of Austrian films
British films based on plays
British black-and-white films
Films scored by Robert Stolz
1930s English-language films
1930s British films